Emily Elizabeth Heller (born October 5, 1985) is an American comedian, writer, actor and podcast host. Her stand-up comedy career includes two Comedy Central specials, two albums, and guest appearances on Conan, Late Night with Seth Meyers, and The Late Late Show with James Corden. She is a writer and producer for the HBO series Barry.

Early life 
Heller was born in Alameda, California. She has an older sister, film writer and director Marielle Heller, and a brother. She graduated from The College Preparatory School in Oakland, California in 2003, and from the University of California, Santa Cruz in 2007, majoring in History of Art and Visual Culture.

Career 
Heller signed an overall development deal with CBS Studios in 2021.

Filmography

As writer and producer 
 Barry
 Medical Police
 People of Earth
 Crowded
 Surviving Jack

As actor/performer
 Codefellas – 2013 animated web series
 Ground Floor – 2014–2015 TBS series, season two 
 Half Hour – 2016 stand-up comedy special
 Ice Thickeners – 2019 stand-up comedy special on Comedy Central
The George Lucas Talk Show -  October 27, 2020, as guest; episode: "Revenge of the Sick"

Discography 
 Good For Her (Kill Rock Stars, 2015)
 Pasta (Kill Rock Stars, 2018)

Other creative work
 Baby Geniuses podcast – co-host, with Lisa Hanawalt
 Emily's Garden Show, a recurring segment on the Lovett or Leave It podcast

Awards and nominations
 2016, Daytime Creative Arts Emmy Award for Outstanding Writing Special Class (32nd Independent Spirit Awards) – nominated 
 2018, Producers Guild of America Award for Best Episodic Comedy (Barry) – nominated
 2018, Primetime Emmy Award for Outstanding Comedy Series (Barry) – nominated
 2018, Writers Guild of America award for Best New Series, for Barry – won
 2018, Writers Guild of America award for Best Comedy Series, for Barry – nominated
 2019, Writers Guild of America award for Best Comedy Series, for Barry – won

References

External links
 
 
 

1985 births
21st-century American actresses
Actresses from the San Francisco Bay Area
American women podcasters
American podcasters
American television actresses
Television producers from California
American television writers
American web series actresses
American women comedians
Living people
People from Alameda, California
University of California, Santa Cruz alumni